Believe You Me is the third studio album by English synth-pop duo Blancmange, released on 11 October 1985 by London Records. A remastered edition was released by Edsel Records in 2008 which featured the album along with four bonus tracks.

Critical reception

Upon release, Simon Braithwaite of Smash Hits stated: "Blancmange have come back with a selection of songs so varied yet simple that they make the whole thing seem practically effortless. Still there are the infernally catchy synthesized dance tracks and ballads but they've also introduced a lot more string arrangements." Mark Booker of Number One commented: "One of the few 'synth' bands who realise that the synth can't do everything, Blancmange have roped in a horde of guest artistes to complement their fine talents and serve up a delicious platter." Billboard stated: "Synth duo gets some help from friends, most notably guitarist David Rhodes, but their relaxed sound proves a little too relaxed to encourage listener involvement, despite some fine playing."

In a retrospective review, Bill Cassel of AllMusic wrote: "Believe You Me is leaner, subtler, and more organic [compared to Mange Tout (1984)], without straying too far from their established sound. Neil Arthur's vocals are stronger, and his and Stephen Luscombe's songwriting is more focused. The result might best be described as "mature techno-pop"." Paul Scott-Bates of Louder Than War considered the album to be "filled with absolute gems and remains truly underrated to this day". He added: "Produced by Stewart Levine, it raised the bar in terms of sparkling production and should have seen the band catapulted into the next level of success."

Track listing
All songs written by Neil Arthur and Stephen Luscombe.

LP: LONLP 10

Side one
 "Lose Your Love" – 4:09
 "What's Your Problem?" – 4:13
 "Paradise Is" – 3:48
 "Why Don't They Leave Things Alone?" – 4:35
 "22339" – 5:23 (1)

Side two
 "Don't You Love It All" – 4:35
 "Believe" – 3:49
 "Lorraine's My Nurse" – 2:31
 "Other Animals" – 4:19
 "No Wonder They Never Made It Back" – 3:31 (1)
 "John"  – 4:16 (2)

CD: 820 301–2
 "Lose Your Love" – 4:09
 "What's Your Problem?" – 4:13
 "Paradise Is" – 3:48
 "Why Don't They Leave Things Alone?" – 4:35
 "22339" – 5:23 (1)
 "Don't You Love It All" – 4:35
 "Believe" – 3:49
 "Lorraine's My Nurse" – 2:31
 "Other Animals" – 4:19
 "No Wonder They Never Made It Back!" – 3:31 (1)
 "John"  – 4:16 (2)

2008 Edsel – Remastered CD: EDSS 1027
 "Lose Your Love" – 4:04
 "What's Your Problem?" – 4:09
 "Paradise Is" – 3:49
 "Why Don't They Leave Things Alone?" – 4:36
 "22339" – 7:01
 "Don't You Love It All" – 4:32
 "Believe" – 3:48
 "Lorraine's My Nurse" – 2:31
 "Other Animals" – 4:33
 "No Wonder They Never Made It Back!" – 4:33 
 "John"  – 4:24 
 "Side Two" – 7:50*
 "Mixing on the Ceiling" [Megamix] – 7:08*
 "I Can See It (Why Don't They Leave Things Alone)" [Extended] – 7:54*
 "Scream Down the House" – 4:07*
Bonus Tracks* 12-15

Chart performance

Personnel

Musicians
 Neil Arthur
 Stephen Luscombe

Additional musicians
 David Rhodes – guitar (1, 2, 3, 4, 5, 6, 7, 9)
 Justin Hildreth – drums (1, 4, 6)
 Hugh Masekela – flugelhorn (6)
 Ronnie Ross – baritone saxophone (9)
 Francis Foster – congas, tambourine (1, 6)
 Pandit Dinesh – tablas, madal (10)
 Katie Kissoon – background voice (6)
 Stevie Lange – background voice (6)
 London Community Gospel Choir – background voices (9)
 Dick Cuthell – trumpet, flugelhorn, cornet, brass arrangement (10)
 Tony Pleeth – cello (4, 10)
 Simon Elliston – flute (4)
 Lynton Naiff – string arrangement (8)
 Gavin Wright – violin (8)
 Dick Morgan – oboe (8)
 Anthea Cox – flute (8)
 Steve Maw – bassoon (8)
 Nigel Warren-Green – cello (8)
 Paul Webb – bass (5)
 Debbie McGee – triangle (5)

Production
 Recorded in London from May to August 1985 at Air, Garden, Island, Redan, Roundhouse, Strongroom and Wessex Studios
 Produced by Stewart Levine for Ultradelta Limited(1) "22339" and "No Wonder They Never Made It Back" produced by Neil Arthur & John Williams(2) "John" produced by Stephen Luscombe
 Engineered by Femi J
 Assistant Engineers: Karl Lever (Air)Pete Griffiths (Garden)Stephen Street (Island)Johnny Schinas (Redan)David Kemp (Roundhouse)Phil Bodger (Strongroom)
 Management by Paul Williams, Paul Smith and Jolyan Burnham
 'Mask' construction by Annie Symons @ Manifest
 Photography by Mike Owen
 Designs by Assorted Images

References

External links
 

1985 albums
Blancmange (band) albums
Albums produced by Stewart Levine
London Records albums